Petershagen Nord (also commonly known as Petershagen) is a railway station located in Petershagen-Eggersdorf, in the Märkisch-Oderland district of Brandenburg. It is served by the S-Bahn line .

Overview
The stop, located in north of Petershagen, is so named (P. North) due to the existence of "Petershagen Süd" (P. South), a railway station on a line, now closed, from Fredersdorf to Rüdersdorf.

References

Berlin S-Bahn stations
Railway stations in Brandenburg
Buildings and structures in Märkisch-Oderland